John B. Corker (born December 29, 1958) is a former American football linebacker who played four seasons in the National Football League, mainly for the Houston Oilers, and eight seasons in the Arena Football League. In 2002, Corker was elected into the Arena Football League Hall of Fame.

Corker was named Big-8 Defensive Player of the Year in 1978 despite playing in only 7 games prior to tearing ligaments in his knee.  He returned in 1979 and was 2nd team All Big-8 and All-American. 

He also played with the Michigan Panthers and the Memphis Showboats of the United States Football League. Corker graduated from South Miami High School in 1976 (South Miami, Florida,) where he played football and basketball.

Corker was named USFL Defensive Player of the Year in 1983 after recording 28.5 sacks in 18 games while playing with the Michigan Panthers.  Corker's efforts also led the Panthers to the USFL Championship that same season.  

After the Panthers merged with the Oakland Invaders before the 1985 USFL season, Corker signed with the Memphis Showboats.  One of his defensive mates was future NFL Hall of Famer, Reggie White.  Corker finished his 3-year USFL career with 42 sacks in 54 games.

In 1994 Corker resurfaced with the Arena Football League's Miami Hooters playing 7 games for head coach Don Strock.

References

1958 births
Living people
Players of American football from Miami
American football linebackers
Oklahoma State Cowboys football players
Houston Oilers players
Green Bay Packers players
Michigan Panthers players
Memphis Showboats players
Detroit Drive players
Miami Hooters players